Niemica  (German: Nemitz) is a village in the administrative district of Gmina Golczewo, within Kamień County, West Pomeranian Voivodeship, in north-western Poland. 

The village has a population of 230.

References

Villages in Kamień County